Tuchín is a town and municipality located in the Córdoba Department, northern Colombia.

Municipalities of Córdoba Department